Lewis Jeffrey Liman (born December 3, 1960) is a United States district judge of the United States District Court for the Southern District of New York.

Education

Liman graduated from the Ethical Culture Fieldston School. He earned his Bachelor of Arts, magna cum laude, from Harvard College, his Master of Science, with distinction, from the London School of Economics, and his Juris Doctor from Yale Law School, where he served as an articles editor of the Yale Law Journal and as an editor of the Yale Journal of International Law.

He is Jewish.

Legal career

Upon graduation from law school he spent a brief period as an attorney at the NAACP Legal Defense and Educational Fund. He served as a law clerk to Judge Pierre N. Leval of the United States Court of Appeals for the Second Circuit during his service as a United States district judge of the Southern District of New York. He then subsequently clerked for Justice John Paul Stevens of the Supreme Court of the United States.

Before  entering private practice, Liman served for five years as an Assistant United States Attorney for the Southern District of New York, where he rose to serve as Deputy Chief of Appeals.

From 2003 to 2019, he was a partner in the New York City office of Cleary Gottlieb Steen & Hamilton, where he has handled a wide range of civil, commercial, and white collar criminal litigation.

Federal judicial service

In August 2017, Liman was one of several candidates pitched to New York Senators Chuck Schumer and Kirsten Gillibrand by the White House as judicial candidates for vacancies on the federal courts in New York. On May 10, 2018, President Donald Trump announced his intent to nominate Liman to serve as a United States district judge for the United States District Court for the Southern District of New York. On May 15, 2018, his nomination was sent to the Senate. He was nominated to the seat that was vacated by Judge Paul A. Crotty, who assumed senior status on August 1, 2015. On August 1, 2018, a hearing on his nomination was held before the Senate Judiciary Committee. On September 13, 2018, his nomination was reported out of committee by a 17–4 vote.

On January 3, 2019, his nomination was returned to the President under Rule XXXI, Paragraph 6 of the United States Senate. On April 8, 2019, President Trump announced the renomination of Liman to the district court. On May 21, 2019, his nomination was sent to the Senate. On June 20, 2019, his nomination was reported out of committee by a 15–7 vote. On December 19, 2019,  his nomination was confirmed by a 64–29 vote. He received his judicial commission on December 31, 2019.

See also 
 List of Jewish American jurists
 List of law clerks of the Supreme Court of the United States (Seat 4)

References

External links 
 
 Appearances at the U.S. Supreme Court from the Oyez Project

1960 births
Living people
20th-century American lawyers
21st-century American judges
21st-century American lawyers
Alumni of the London School of Economics
Assistant United States Attorneys
Cravath, Swaine & Moore associates
Ethical Culture Fieldston School alumni
Harvard College alumni
Judges of the United States District Court for the Southern District of New York
Law clerks of the Supreme Court of the United States
Lawyers from New York City
New York (state) lawyers
United States district court judges appointed by Donald Trump
Wilmer Cutler Pickering Hale and Dorr partners
Yale Law School alumni